Geoffrey Somerset, 6th Baron Raglan (born 29 August 1932), is a British peer, businessman, and Conservative politician.

Early life
Raglan is the younger son of FitzRoy Somerset, 4th Baron Raglan, by his marriage to the Hon. Julia Hamilton, daughter of the 11th Lord Belhaven and Stenton. He was educated at the Dragon School, Oxford, Westminster School, and the Royal Agricultural College.

Field Marshal Lord Raglan, the first baron, was the eighth son of Henry Somerset, 5th Duke of Beaufort, so the Lords Raglan are distantly in the line of succession to the dukedom of Beaufort.

Life
After completing his National Service as an officer in the Grenadier Guards, Raglan was a trainee with the Rootes Group from 1954 to 1957, an Instructor at the Standard Motor Company 1957–1960, then sales and later Marketing Manager, Lambourn Engineering  1960–1971. From 1971 to 1994 he was a wine shipper and from 1994 to 2013 an insurance broker.

He served as President of the Lambourn St John Ambulance Division 1964–1981, President of the Lambourn branch of the Royal British Legion 1963–1977, a member of Berkshire County Council 1966–1975 (Chairman Mental Welfare Sub-Committee, Chairman Children's Homes & Nurseries Sub-Committee, Chairman Children's Homes, Chairman of Governors of Tesdale & Bennet House special schools). He was a member of Newbury District Council from 1979 to 1983 and chaired its Recreation & Amenities Committee, Chairman of the Stanford Conservative Association 1984 to 1988 and again 1997 to 2000, member of the Oxfordshire Valuation Tribunal and later a Chairman of Thames Valley Valuation Tribunals between 1987 and 2004, a member of Oxfordshire County Council 1988–1993, Chairman Vale of White Horse District of the Campaign to Protect Rural England (CPRE) 2000–2004 (and a Committee Member to date). He is also a Vice-President of the Oxfordshire Grenadier Guards Association and a Liveryman of the Worshipful Company of Skinners.

He succeeded to the title of Baron Raglan on 24 January 2010 on the death of his older brother, Fitzroy Somerset, the 5th Baron.

Family
In 1956, Geoffrey Somerset married Caroline Rachel Hill (d. 5 July 2014), a daughter of Colonel Edward Roderick Hill DSO, of St Arvans Court, Chepstow, Monmouthshire, by his marriage to Rachel Hicks Beach. They have had three children, two daughters and a son now deceased.
Hon. Belinda Caroline Somerset, now Boyd (born 9 February 1958), educated at St Gabriel's School, Newbury, Chatelard School, Bradfield College, Founder and Director 20 Public Relations, married 1989 Nicholas Gant Boyd, eldest son of Cdr Christopher Boyd DSC RN.
Hon. Arthur Geoffrey Somerset (27 April 1960 – 25 July 2012), educated at Dragon School, Oxford, and Bradfield College, married 2001 Tanya Arabel, only daughter of Roger Broome. He was the founder and CEO of Mask Event Design & Production (1988–2008), President of the International Special Events Society UK & Europe (2002–2004), Regional Vice-President Europe, Middle East and Africa (2004–2005), Chairman Trellech Conservatives from 2011. Their children are Inigo Arthur Fitzroy Somerset (born 7 July 2004), now heir apparent to the barony; Ivo Geoffrey Arthur Tarsus Somerset (born 6 July 2007); and Oona-Vita Olwen Phyllis Caroline Somerset (born February 2010).
Hon. Lucy Ann Somerset (born 8 February 1963) educated St Gabriel's School, Newbury, married 1998 Richard Scott Watson FRCS and has issue Rachel Elise (born 2000), George Anthony (born 2002), Theo Alan (born 2004).

Seats
The family seat was Cefntilla Court, Llandenny, in Monmouthshire. An inscription over the porch dated 1858 reads: "This house with 238 acres of land was purchased by 1623 of the friends, admirers and comrades in arms of the late Field Marshal Lord Raglan GCB and presented by them to his son and his heirs for ever in a lasting memorial of affectionate regard and respect". The 5th Baron Raglan willed Cefntilla to the son of his sister, and not to the heirs of the barony. The will was disputed by the Hon Arthur Somerset, son and heir of Geoffrey Somerset, but following his death on 25 July 2012 the dispute was settled.

References

External links
Pedigree of Geoffrey Somerset, 6th Baron Raglan
Entry at The Peerage.com

1932 births
Barons in the Peerage of the United Kingdom
Conservative Party (UK) councillors
Members of Berkshire County Council
Geoffrey Somerset, 6th Baron Raglan
Living people
Members of Oxfordshire County Council
People educated at The Dragon School
People educated at Westminster School, London
Younger sons of barons